St. Alexander Nevsky Church is an Eastern Orthodox church in Riga, the capital of Latvia. The church is situated at the address 56 Brīvības Street.

References

External links 
 
 Приход храма святого благоверного великого князя Александра Невского www.baznicai.lv

Churches in Riga
Eastern Orthodox churches in Latvia
Church buildings with domes